Brest Bretagne Handball, also knows as BBH, is a French handball club from Brest, Brittany. This team currently competes in the French Women's Handball First League from 2016 and the 2021–22 Women's EHF Champions League.

In the 2020–2021 EHF Champions League, the club reached the EHF Final 4 tournament for the first time in the club's history. They won an historic semifinal, against the three-time defending champions and five-time winners from Győri Audi ETO KC. In the final, they were defeated by Norwegian Vipers Kristiansand, who also claimed their first title.

Crest, colours, supporters

Naming history

Kits

Results
EHF Champions League:
Runner-up: 2021
French Women's First League Championship:
Winners: 2012, 2021
Runner-up: 2011, 2017, 2018, 2022
French Women's Cup Championship:
Winners: 2016, 2018, 2021
Runner-up: 2019
French Women's League Cup Championship:
Winners: 2012
Runner-up: 2011

European record

Team

Current squad
Squad for the 2022–23 season

Goalkeepers
 1  Darly de Paula
 12  Petra Marinović
 16  Cléopâtre Darleux 
 97  Julie Foggea 
Wingers
LW
 2  Constance Mauny
 10  Coralie Lassource (c)
 17  Estel Memana 
RW
 3  Alicia Toublanc
 30  Siobann Delaye
 55  Pauline Coatanea (pregnant)
Line players
 20  Merel Freriks
 22  Pauletta Foppa  
 34  Tatjana Brnović

Back players
LB
 9  Đurđina Jauković 
  19  Elisa Técher

CB
 6  Helene Gigstad Fauske
 42  Jenny Carlson
 96  Itana Grbić
RB
 8  Monika Kobylińska
 21  Aïssatou Kouyaté
 63  Eva Jarrige

Transfers

Transfers for the 2023–24 season

 Joining
  Valeriia Maslova (RB) (from  Metz Handball)
  Audrey Dembele (LB) (from  ESBF Besançon)
  Charlotte Cholevová (LB) (from  DHK Baník Most)
  Juliette Faure (CB) (from  ESBF Besançon)

 Leaving
  Monika Kobylińska (RB) (to  CSM București)
  Helene Gigstad Fauske (LB) (to  Neptunes de Nantes)
  Itana Grbić (CB) 
  Tatjana Brnović (LP) (to  RK Krim)

Technical staff

Staff for the 2022–23 season.
 Head coach: Pablo Morel
 Assistant coach: Damien Nedelec
 Goalkeeping coach: Mathieu Kreiss
 Fitness coach: Tom Folain

Notable former players 

 Allison Pineau (2016-2019)
 Alexandra Lacrabère (2010-2012)
 Astride N'Gouan (2015-2018)
 Sophie Herbrecht (2017-2018)
 Lindsay Burlet (2017-2018)
 Marie Prouvensier (2016-2019)
 Maud-Éva Copy (2012-2019)
 Amandine Tissier (2015-2021)
 Kalidiatou Niakaté (2019-2022)
 Slađana Pop-Lazić (2017-2022)
 Biljana Filipović (2010-2012)
 Jelena Popović (2011-2012)
 Jovana Stoiljković (2017-2019)
 Isabelle Gulldén (2018-2021)
 Louise Sand (2017-2018)
 Filippa Idéhn (2017-2019)
 Mayssa Pessoa (2009-2011)
 Moniky Bancilon (2011-2013)
 Ana Gros (2018-2021)
 Amra Pandžić (2018-2019)
 Marta Mangué (2015-2020)
 Nely Carla Alberto (2015-2016)
 Monika Kobylińska (2019-2023)
 Monika Stachowska (2010-2012)
 Faten Yahiaoui (2013-2014)
 Ouided Kilani (2009)
 Tonje Løseth (2020-2022)
 Helene Gigstad Fauske (2021-2023)
 Sandra Toft (2019-2022)
 Melinda Geiger (2016-2017)
 Tatjana Brnović (2022-2023)
 Ewgenija Minevskaja (2019-2020)
 Anastasiia Pidpalova (2013-2014)
 Nabila Tizi (2013-2017)
 Szabina Tápai (2009-2010)
 Julija Portjanko (2010-2012)

Arena 

Name: Brest Arena
City: Brest, France
Capacity: 4,077 spectators
Address: 149 Boulevard de Plymouth, 29200 Brest

Kit manufacturers

Statistics

Top scorers in the EHF Champions League 
(All-Time) – Last updated on 20 March 2023

Individual awards in the EHF Champions League

References

External links
 

French handball clubs
Sport in Brest, France